Peter van Roye (born 30 May 1950) is a German rower who competed for West Germany in the 1976 Summer Olympics.

He was born in Lingen. In 1976 he and his partner Thomas Strauß won the bronze medal in the coxless pairs event.

References

External links
 

1950 births
Living people
People from Lingen
Olympic rowers of West Germany
Rowers at the 1976 Summer Olympics
Olympic bronze medalists for West Germany
Olympic medalists in rowing
West German male rowers
World Rowing Championships medalists for West Germany
Medalists at the 1976 Summer Olympics
Sportspeople from Lower Saxony